Frikkie Welsh (born 26 October 1978) is a South African former rugby union player. He represented the Bulls and the Stormers in the Super Rugby competition.

References

External links 
WP rugby profile

Living people
1978 births
South African rugby union players
Stormers players
Western Province (rugby union) players
Rugby union centres
Sharks (Currie Cup) players
Pumas (Currie Cup) players
Bulls (rugby union) players
Blue Bulls players
Rugby union players from Mpumalanga